Mouadjebara is a town and commune in Djelfa Province, Algeria. According to the 1998 census it has a population of 10,365.

References

Communes of Djelfa Province
Cities in Algeria